Fruit Gushers (also simply Gushers) are a Betty Crocker-branded fruit snack introduced in 1991.  They are soft and chewy with a fruity-juice center.

History
Fruit Gushers (sometimes simply "Gushers") were introduced in 1991 as a Betty Crocker fruit snack.

Composition
Strawberry-flavored Fruit Gushers are composed of pear concentrate, sugar, dried corn syrup, corn syrup, modified corn starch, fructose, and grape juice concentrate.  Targeted at children, they were acorn-shaped with a soft "licorice-like" exterior and a liquid inside, included "strawberries and pear puree concentrate", and came in two flavors: "Strawberry Splash" and "Gushin' Grape".

In his 2018 book, Nourishment: What Animals Can Teach Us About Rediscovering Our Nutritional Wisdom, Fred Provenza noted that while Fruit Gushers are fruit-flavored, their nutritional composition is very different from their produce counterparts. While 90 calories worth of Strawberry Fruit Gushers equaled  and contained  of sugar, 1g of fat, and cost ; 90 calories worth of actual strawberries equaled  and contained  of dietary fiber, "many minerals and vitamins, and thousands of phytochemicals." Provenza called Fruit Gushers "empty calories".

Varieties
Betty Crocker released a new variety of Fruit Gushers in early 2020: "Galactic Fruit Gushers". These featured the flavors "Asteroid Apple", "Berry Star Cluster", and a mystery flavor labeled "Unidentified Flavored Object"; the latter was part of a contest where consumers could guess at the unknown flavor and win prizes "like sweatshirts, hats, blankets, pop sockets, and more".

Reception
A 1991 Sun-Sentinel review said that the insides oozed rather than gushed, and found the confectionery surprisingly pleasant.  In 2013, Complex magazine ranked Fruit Gushers the second-best fruit snack of all time, coming in behind another Betty Crocker product, Shark Bites.

References

External links
 Fruit Gushers at BettyCrocker.com

American snack foods
brand name confectionery
General Mills brands
products introduced in 1991